A microtheme is a short essay (spanning 100-500 words or that can be fit on a 5″x8″ index card). Often an exercise unto itself, it can also be used in writing courses to incrementally build up toward a larger paper. Microthemes allow for quick grading, such as A+/A/A-. The best way to get better at writing is to write often and in this case, you should practice wiring the same thing over and over in different ways and with different combinations of words.

References

Essays